bunq B.V. (colloquially named bunq — bank of The Free;) is a Dutch fintech and neobank licensed in the Netherlands within the European Union and operating in 30 European countries. It was founded in Amsterdam where its headquarters are currently located.

The company was founded in 2012 by Dutch-Canadian entrepreneur Ali Niknam, who previously founded web hosting provider TransIP and The Datacenter Group.

It began opening other offices from 2019 onward and currently has a presence in Amsterdam, Rotterdam, Dublin, Sofia, Madrid, Brussels, Vienna and Warsaw. The company achieved unicorn status in 2021. bunq is often considered a challenger bank or disruptor.

History

Early history (2012-2015) 
Much of bunq's early history is documented in the book BreakThrough Banking by Dutch author Siebe Huizinga.

According to BreakThrough Banking, much of bunq's early efforts went toward obtaining a European banking license from ‘De Nederlandsche Bank’, the central bank of the Netherlands. In 2014, bunq received a banking license from the Dutch central bank, after which the company launched its bunq app and became the first fully mobile Dutch bank.

Breakthrough Banking further describes how Niknam's background as a programmer factored heavily into bunq's development. Most of the people Huizinga mentions as early contributors to the company were developers or came from an IT background. Niknam has stated in interviews that “bunq is the only bank built by coders”. This seems to have resonated in bunq's early public perception, as the bank was frequently labeled “an IT company with a banking license”. At its launch in 2015, bunq was coined “WhatsApp for Banking” by Dutch newspaper NRC, further underscoring its product and technology-focused banking model as an alternative to traditional ones.

International expansion (2015-present) 
Although initially catering to the Dutch market, bunq expanded throughout Europe in the years following its launch: it offers mobile banking services in the Netherlands, Belgium, France, Germany, Ireland, Italy, Portugal and Spain. As of 2019, bunq's financial services are available worldwide to residents of 30 European countries.

In the early 2020s bunq started to offer multiple currencies and IBANs on a single subscription, regardless of the account holder's geographical location or residency.

Unlike other European neobanks, bunq has yet to publicly disclose how many people have an account with the company.

Up until 2021, founder Ali Niknam was bunq's sole benefactor, having invested more than 120 million euros of his funds into the company.

In 2021, user deposits number surpassed 1.2 billion euro.

At its public launch in 2015, bunq offered personal bank accounts. It added business bank accounts in 2016.

In addition, bunq offers a public API, cited as a move ahead of the European PSD2 directive. It allows software developers to access their bank accounts programmatically and to build their apps, which bunq itself facilitates on its developer page and API marketplace.

By 2021, bunq became the first digital bank to offer mortgages.

Because of its banking license, bunq account holders fall under the Deposit Guarantee Scheme of the European Central Bank.

In 2021 bunq secured the largest Series A round for a European fintech company to date, bringing its valuation to 1.6 billion euros and granting bunq unicorn status. Later that year bunq was valued at $2 billion in an investment deal.

In March 2022, bunq's CEO announced a creation of a special fund aimed to help refugees from Ukraine (resulted after Russia invaded Ukraine in February 2022) to come to Netherlands. Bunq also stated that it would provide Ukrainian refugees with free bunq bank accounts.

In May 2022, bunq announced that they had acquired the Belgium-based fintech organisation Tricount. While the price of the deal was left undisclosed, the firm stated they will make an extra 5.4 million users overall. This acquisition saw bunq become the second largest neobank in the European Union.

In October 2022, bunq won a landmark court case against the Dutch Central Bank. bunq had taken the DNB to court over the central bank’s anti-money laundering (AML) policies. The court ruled in favor of bunq using a learning system based on Artificial Intelligence, rather than a rule-based system imposed by DNB. The ruling made it possible for other banks to modernize their own AML strategies as well.

See also 

 Klarna
 Wise
 N26
 Revolut

References

Companies based in Amsterdam
Online payments
Banks established in 2012